Auglaize Township is an inactive township in Laclede County, in the U.S. state of Missouri.

Auglaize Township was established in 1874, taking its name from the Dry Auglaize River.

References

Townships in Missouri
Townships in Laclede County, Missouri